Our Trees Still Grow in Dehra is a collection of 14 short stories written by Ruskin Bond. It was published in 1991. He was awarded Sahitya Academy Award in 1992 for it.

References 

Indian short story collections
1991 short story collections
Penguin Books India books
Works by Ruskin Bond